Afek can refer to:

Places in the biblical Land of Israel

Aphek (biblical) refers to a number of sites with the same name mentioned in the Bible
Aphik (Asher) one of the biblical sites belonging to the Tribe of Asher
Aphaca, a city in classical Syria believed by some to be the Asherite city:
Afka, a modern town at the site in Lebanon
Tel Afek, a site located near Haifa believed by some to be the Asherite city
Afek, Israel, a kibbutz located at the Tel near Haifa
Another site known as Tel Afek or Antipatris, near Petah Tikva and Rosh HaAyin
Migdal Afek, also near Rosh HaAyin Majdal Yaba
Aphek Turris also refers to Majdal Yaba
A site in the Golan Heights:
Fiq, Syria, a former Syrian village at the Tel
Afik, a current Israeli settlement and kibbutz at the Tel
Fiq Airfield, a small civilian airfield near the settlement/kibbutz
Afikim, a kibbutz in the Galilee nearby, but unrelated to the Golan Heights site

Other uses
Afek (surname), Hebrew-language surname
Afek (mythology), a cultural heroine in some Papuan groups' mythology
Afek Oil & Gas, a subsidiary of Genie Energy Ltd. and controls Genie Energy Ltd.'s oil and gas exploratory project in Northern Israel, including the Golan Heights region
Battle of Aphek, in which the Philistines defeated the Israelite army and captured the Ark of the Covenant

See also
Fiq (disambiguation)